Pinus brutia, commonly known as the Turkish pine, is a species of pine native to the eastern Mediterranean region. The bulk of its range is in Turkey.

Turkish pine is also known by several other common names: Calabrian pine (from a naturalised population of the pine in Calabria in southern Italy, from where the pine was first botanically described), East Mediterranean pine, and Brutia pine.

Description
The bark is orange-red, thick and deeply fissured at the base of the trunk, and thin and flaky in the upper crown.

They open slowly over the next year or two to release the seeds, opening to  broad.

Varieties
Turkish pine is closely related to Aleppo pine, Canary Island pine, and Maritime pine, which all share many features with it. Some authors have treated it as a subspecies of Aleppo pine, but it is usually regarded as a distinct species. It is a moderately variable species, and the following subspecies and varieties are named:

The Eldar pine is treated as a species (Pinus eldarica) by some authors; it is adapted to a drier climate with a summer rainfall peak, whereas var. brutia, var. pityusa, and var. pendulifolia are adapted to a climate with mainly winter rainfall.

Taxonomy
Italian botanist Michele Tenore described the species in 1811.

Distribution and habitat

The bulk of its range is in Turkey, but it also extends to southeasternmost Bulgaria, the East Aegean Islands of Aegean Sea, Crete, Crimea, Iran, Georgia, Azerbaijan, northern Iraq, western Syria, Lebanon and Cyprus.

Ecology
Pinus brutia is a diagnostic species of the vegetation class Pinetea halepensis.

The Krüper's nuthatch, a rare nuthatch, is largely restricted to forests of Turkish pine and depends heavily on it for feeding; the ranges of the two species are largely coincident.

P. brutia is resistant to the Israeli pine bast scale insect Matsucoccus josephi and is a major host for Thaumetopoea caterpillars.

It forms ectomycorrhizal associations with numerous species of fungi, and its logs and branches are excellent substrates for many kinds of decomposing organisms.

Uses

Honey
Turkish pine is host to a sap-sucking aphid Marchalina hellenica. Under normal circumstances, this insect does no significant damage to the pine, but is of great importance for the excess sugar it secretes. This sugar, "honeydew", is collected by honey bees which make it into a richly flavoured and valuable honey, "pine honey" (Turkish, çam balı), with reputed medicinal benefits.

Landmark
The "Lone Pine", a prominent landmark tree at an ANZAC First World War battle at Gallipoli, was this species. Cones from the battlefield were taken home to Australia, and plants sourced from the seeds were planted as living memorials.

"Lone Pine" memorials, based on cones brought back from Gallipoli, may use this species or Aleppo pine. Some memorials utilise other species altogether.

Forestry
It is widely planted for timber, both in its native area (it is the most important tree in forestry in Turkey and Cyprus) and elsewhere in the Mediterranean region east to Pakistan.
The timber is used for many purposes including carpentry, industry, general constructions, firewood and pulp. In Israel it is sometimes preferred to the wider-used Pinus halepensis (Aleppo pine) because of its resistance to Matsucoccus josephi. It is also known for being well suited to recreational sites.

Cultivation
Pinus brutia is a popular ornamental tree, extensively planted in parks and gardens in hot dry areas (such as southern California, Utah, New Mexico and Nevada, as well as throughout Arizona and central Texas in the United States), where its considerable heat and drought tolerance is highly valued. The subspecies eldarica is the most drought tolerant form, used in Afghanistan, Iran and more recently in the Southwestern United States. In this region, P. brutia subsp. eldarica is referred to as "Eldarica pine", "Afghan pine" or "Mondell pine" (after Mondell Bennett, a commercial tree grower in New Mexico who popularized the species starting in 1969).

References

Further reading 

 Shayanmehr, F., Jalali, S. G., Ghanati, F., & Kartoolinejad, D. (2008). Discrimination of Pinus eldarica MEDW. and its two new species by epicuticular wax, lignin content, electrophoretic isozyme and activity of peroxidase. Feddes Repertorium, 119(7‐8), 644–654. http://onlinelibrary.wiley.com/doi/10.1002/fedr.200811188/full 
 Shayanmehr, F., Jalali, S. G., Ghanati, F., Kartoolinejad, D., & Apple, M. E. (2009). Two new morphotypes of Pinus eldarica: Discrimination by macromorphological and anatomical traits. Dendrobiology, 61, 27–36. http://onlinelibrary.wiley.com/doi/10.1002/fedr.200811188/full

Frankis, M. P. (1999). Pinus brutia. Curtis's Botanical Magazine 16: 173–184.

External links
Photos of trees in Turkey (scroll down page)
Gymnosperm Database - Pinus brutia
Conifers Around the World: Pinus brutia – Calabrian pine
 Pinus brutia - distribution map, genetic conservation units and related resources. European Forest Genetic Resources Programme (EUFORGEN)

brutia
Trees of Western Asia
Flora of Azerbaijan
Flora of Bulgaria
Flora of Georgia (country)
Flora of Greece
Trees of Mediterranean climate
Garden plants of Asia
Garden plants of Europe
Drought-tolerant trees
Ornamental trees
Natural history of Anatolia
Flora of the Mediterranean Basin